Francisco "Paco" Javier Clos Orozco (born 8 August 1960) is a Spanish retired professional football striker and manager.

Club career
Born in Mataró, Barcelona, Catalonia, Clos spent his career mainly in lowly teams in his native region, although he did manage to compete in seven La Liga seasons: six for FC Barcelona, mostly as a backup, and one for Real Murcia (he also appeared with the latter club in the Segunda División, in the 1989–90 and 1990–91 campaigns).

Clos had a lengthy spell as manager after his retirement in 1994, with all the sides also hailing from his region of birth, mostly in amateur football.

International career
During his stint with Barça, Clos earned three caps for Spain, all in 1985, but never took part in any major international tournament. On 27 February 1985, however, he scored the game's only goal in a 1986 FIFA World Cup qualifier against Scotland, which later proved decisive for Miguel Muñoz side's qualification (eight group points to seven).

International goals

Honours
Barcelona
La Liga: 1984–85
Copa del Rey: 1982–83, 1987–88
Supercopa de España: 1983
Copa de la Liga: 1986

References

External links

1960 births
Living people
People from Mataró
Sportspeople from the Province of Barcelona
Spanish footballers
Footballers from Catalonia
Association football forwards
La Liga players
Segunda División players
Segunda División B players
FC Barcelona Atlètic players
CE Sabadell FC footballers
FC Barcelona players
Real Murcia players
Orihuela Deportiva CF footballers
CE Mataró players
Spain under-21 international footballers
Spain international footballers
Spanish football managers
Segunda División B managers
Tercera División managers
CF Badalona managers
CD Atlético Baleares managers
FC Santboià managers